Sandor Martínez-Breijo (born 21 March 1981) is a Cuban former professional tennis player.

Martínez holds the Cuban record for the most Davis Cup appearances, featuring in a total of 29 ties between 1998 and 2009. He is the team's most successful doubles player, with 18 wins in doubles rubbers, to go with his four singles wins.

At the 1998 Central American and Caribbean Games, Martínez won a gold medal for Cuba in the team event, alongside Lázaro Navarro and Juan Pino. He also represented Cuba in the 1999 and 2007 editions of the Pan American Games.

References

External links
 
 
 

1981 births
Living people
Cuban male tennis players
Tennis players at the 1999 Pan American Games
Tennis players at the 2007 Pan American Games
Pan American Games competitors for Cuba
Competitors at the 1998 Central American and Caribbean Games
Competitors at the 2006 Central American and Caribbean Games
Central American and Caribbean Games medalists in tennis
Central American and Caribbean Games gold medalists for Cuba
Central American and Caribbean Games bronze medalists for Cuba
20th-century Cuban people
21st-century Cuban people